Abror Ismoilov (Uzbek Cyrillic: Aброрбек Исмоилов; born 8 January 1998) is an Uzbekistani footballer who currently plays as a midfielder for Pakhtakor.

References

1998 births
Living people
Uzbekistani footballers
Uzbekistan youth international footballers
Association football midfielders
Pakhtakor Tashkent FK players
Uzbekistan international footballers
Uzbekistan Super League players